Suleiky Gómez (born 1984) is a team handball player from Cuba for italian team PDO Handball Team Salerno. She has played on the Cuba women's national handball team, and participated at the 2011 World Women's Handball Championship in Brazil.

References

1984 births
Living people
Cuban female handball players
Handball players at the 2007 Pan American Games
Pan American Games medalists in handball
Pan American Games silver medalists for Cuba
Medalists at the 2007 Pan American Games